Zhang Hongnan (Chinese: 张宏楠; Pinyin: Zhāng Hóngnán; born 17 January 1991) is a Chinese footballer.

Club career
Zhang Hongnan was promoted to Guangzhou Pharmaceutical's first team squad in 2009, but didn't have a chance to appear in the league game until 2012. On 11 May 2012, he made his debut for Guangzhou Evergrande in a 3-1 loss against Dalian Shide. Zhang played at left back in the match; however, he was responsible for all three goals which Guangzhou conceded and was subsequently substituted by Tang Dechao in the 70th minute. In February 2014, Zhang moved to China League One side Qingdao Hainiu on a one-year loan deal.

Zhang was loaned to League One side Shenzhen FC in February 2015. He transferred to Shenzhen FC in January 2016.

On 4 March 2018, Zhang transferred to China League Two side Hainan Boying.

International career
Zhang received his first call-up to the Chinese under-20 national team in June 2009 and played in the 2010 AFC U-19 Championship qualification. He received the call-up once for the Chinese under-22 national team in April 2012 for an international friendly against Malawi, but he did not appear in the match.

Career statistics
Statistics accurate as of match played 13 October 2018

Honours

Club
Guangzhou Evergrande
China League One: 2010
Chinese Super League: 2011, 2012, 2013
Chinese FA Super Cup: 2012
Chinese FA Cup: 2012
AFC Champions League: 2013

References

1991 births
Living people
Footballers from Shenyang
Chinese footballers
Guangzhou F.C. players
Qingdao F.C. players
Shenzhen F.C. players
Chinese Super League players
China League One players
Association football defenders